Gibbula magus, common name the great top shell, is a species of small sea snail, a marine gastropod mollusc in the family Trochidae, the top snails.

Description
The size of the shell varies between 17 mm and 35 mm.  This is an abundant species. The solid, widely, deeply umbilicate shell has a  low-conical shape. There is great variation in color. It is whitish or yellowish, painted with zigzag radiating stripes, maculations or lines of pink or rich brown, sometimes so broken into minute flecks as to appear minutely mottled all over, or sometimes lacking markings. The base of the shell is radiately zigzag-striped. The apex is acute. The conical spire  contains 7 to 8 whorl. These are swollen, gibbous and radiately plicate beneath the sutures, and with a rim or flange at the periphery. The entire surface is spirally finely striate. The base is convex. The aperture is very oblique, rounded-rhomboid, and smooth within. The columella oblique, its edge straight or slightly convex in the middle, at its insertion reflexed slightly over the umbilicus. The umbilicus is bounded by a strong spiral rib.

Distribution
This species occurs in the North Sea, the North Atlantic Ocean (Azores, Morocco) and in the Mediterranean Sea.

References

 Coen G. (1930). Gibbula (Forskaliopsis nov. sect.) Bellinii n. sp. nuovo gasteropodo marino di Capri. Annuario del Museo Zoologico della Reale Università di Napoli (n. ser.) 6(4): 2
 Coen, G. (1937) Nuovo saggio di una sylloge molluscorum Adriaticorum. Memoria Reale Comitato Talassografico Italiano, 240, 1–173, 10 pls.
 Nordsieck, F. (1982) Die Europäischen Meeres-Gehäuseschnecken (Prosobranchia). Vom Eismeer bis Kapverden, Mittelmeer und Schwarzes Meer. 2., Völlig Neubearbeitete und Erweiterte Auflage. Gustav Fischer Verlag, Stuttgart, xii + 539 pp.

External links
 
 Da Costa, Mendes E. (1778). Historia naturalis testaceorum Britanniæ, or, the British conchology; containing the descriptions and other particulars of natural history of the shells of Great Britain and Ireland: illustrated with figures. In English and French. - Historia naturalis testaceorum Britanniæ, ou, la conchologie Britannique; contenant les descriptions & autres particularités d'histoire naturelle des coquilles de la Grande Bretagne & de l'Irlande: avec figures en taille douce. En anglois & françois., i-xii, 1-254, i-vii, [1, Pl. I-XVII. London. (Millan, White, Emsley & Robson)]
 Linnaeus, C. (1758). Systema Naturae per regna tria naturae, secundum classes, ordines, genera, species, cum characteribus, differentiis, synonymis, locis. Editio decima, reformata [10th revised edition, vol. 1: 824 pp. Laurentius Salvius: Holmiae]
 Locard, A. (1886). Prodrome de malacologie française. Catalogue général des mollusques vivants de France. Mollusque marins. i>Lyon, H. Georg & Paris, Baillière pp. X + 778.
 Griffith E. & Pidgeon E. (1833-1834). The Mollusca and Radiata. Vol. 12, In: E. Griffith, [1824−1835, The Animal Kingdom arranged in conformity with its organization, by the Baron Cuvier, [...]. London: Whittaker and Co., viii + 601 pp., 61 pls. [Date of publication after Evenhuis (2009): pp. 1-384, Mollusca pls. 1−39, Zoophytes pls 1-20 - 1833; pp. viii + 385-601, Mollusca corrected pls. 28*, 36*, 37*, pls. 40-41 - 1834]. , available online at http://www.biodiversitylibrary.org/item/40578 page(s): pl. 1, fig. 1]
 Bucquoy E., Dautzenberg P. & Dollfus G. (1882-1886). Les mollusques marins du Roussillon. Tome Ier. Gastropodes. Paris: Baillière & fils. 570 pp., 66 pls. [pp. 1-84, pls 1-10, 1882; pp. 85-196, pls 11-20, 1883; pp. 197-342, pls 21-40, 1884; pp. 343-418, pls 41-50, 1885; pp. 419-570, pls 51-66, 
 http://www.biodiversitylibrary.org/item/55187
 Gofas, S.; Le Renard, J.; Bouchet, P. (2001). Mollusca, in: Costello, M.J. et al. (Ed.) (2001). European register of marine species: a check-list of the marine species in Europe and a bibliography of guides to their identification. Collection Patrimoines Naturels, 50: pp. 180–213

magus
Gastropods described in 1758
Taxa named by Carl Linnaeus
Molluscs of the Atlantic Ocean
Molluscs of the Mediterranean Sea
Molluscs of the Azores
Invertebrates of North Africa
Fauna of the North Sea